Wilderness is an album by country musician C. W. McCall, a pseudonym of singer and advertising executive Bill Fries, released on Polydor Records in 1976 (see 1976 in music). As its title suggests, it focuses on subjects connected with nature, the environment and humans' impact on them. "There Won't Be No Country Music (There Won't Be No Rock 'n' Roll)", for example, is a statement on the environment's bleak-looking future and the effects of over-commercialization bordering on propaganda. "Crispy Critters", on the other hand, is the humorous telling of a true tale involving a group of hippies riding into a town and being forced away and threatened by the mayor.

Like most works credited to C. W. McCall, Bill Fries provides vocals, and all songs are written by Fries and Chip Davis.

Track listing
 "Wilderness" (Bill Fries, Chip Davis) – 3:38
 "Jackson Hole" (Fries, Davis) – 2:39
 "Riverside Slide" (Fries, Davis) – 3:22
 "Crispy Critters" (Fries, Davis) – 2:50
 "Roy" (Fries, Davis) – 0:35
 "The Little Brown Sparrow and Me" (Fries, Davis) – 3:57
 "There Won't Be No Country Music (There Won't Be No Rock 'N' Roll)" (Fries, Davis) – 3:50
 "Telluride Breakdown" (Fries, Davis) – 2:08
 "Four Wheel Cowboy" (Fries, Davis) – 3:27
 "Silver Iodide Blues" (Fries, Davis) – 1:17
 "Columbine" (Fries, Davis) – 1:45
 "Aurora Borealis" (Fries, Davis) – 4:09

Personnel

 C. W. McCall - Vocals, Design
 Ron Agnew, Almeda Berkey, Gary Morris, Carol Rogers, Jan Sheldrick, Kris Sparks, Sarah Westphalen - Vocals
 Chip Davis - Vocals, Drums, Producer, Arranger
 Milt Bailey, Jackson Berkey - Vocals, Keyboards
 Ron Cooley - 12-String Guitar, Electric Guitar
 Eric Hansen - Bass
 Steve Hanson - Banjo
 Dick Solowicz - Pots and Pans
 Chris Stoval - Chimes
 Mortimer Alpert, Bruce Bransby, Ruth Bransby, Dorothy Brown, Hugh Brown, Miriam Dufflemeyer, Ginni Eldred, Lucinda Gladics, James Hammond, Jean Hassel, Joe Landes, Gary Lawrence, Beth McCollum, Martin Pearson, Gertrude Phalp, Barbara Potter, Merton Shatzkin, Alex Sokol - Strings
 Robert Jenkins, Willis Ann Ross - Woodwinds
 Gene Badgett, Michael Berger, Frank Franano, Steve Miller, David Reiswig, Richard Scott, Jim Schanilec, Jim Shoush, Dan Strom, Don Swaggard, Bill Trumbauer, Stephen Wager, Mike Young - Brass

Additional personnel

 Don Sears - Producer, Engineer, Design, Photography
 John Boyd - Engineer
 Dudycha, Schirck and Associates, Inc. - Art Direction and Production

Charts

Album - Billboard (North America)

Singles - Billboard (North America)

References

External links
 NarrowGauge.org album information for Wilderness

Wilderness
Wilderness
Wilderness